This is a list of electoral results for the Electoral division of Arafura in Northern Territory elections.

Members for Arafura

Election results

Elections in the 1980s

Elections in the 1990s

 Preferences were not distributed.

The two candidate preferred vote was not counted between the Labor and Independent candidates for Arafura.

Elections in the 2000s

Elections in the 2010s

Elections in the 2020s

References

Northern Territory electoral results by district